Rajesh Kava (born 18 March 1979) is an Indian voice actor, fluent in Hindi, Gujarati and English.

He is best known for being the third Hindi dub-over voice artist for Daniel Radcliffe's role as Harry Potter, in the last three Harry Potter films, after it was passed on from Ami Trivedi's brother, Karan Trivedi. He also voiced for Orlando Bloom as Legolas in The Lord of the Rings film trilogy.

He also has a YouTube channel where he does a series called Voice Acting ki Jugalbandi with other dubbing artists.

Filmography

Animated series

Animated films

Dubbing roles

Live action series

Animated series

Live action films

Hollywood films

Indian films

Animated films

Films and other shows he dubbed voices in
Diary of a Wimpy Kid, Diary of a Wimpy Kid: Rodrick Rules, Diary of a Wimpy Kid: Dog Days, Diary of a Wimpy Kid: The Long Haul, he voiced Greg Heffley in these films, the original actors of him are Zachary Gordon and Jason Drucker (he only voiced him in Diary of a Wimpy Kid: The Long Haul).
 Ben 10: Omniverse, he voiced Ben 23 (in only episode 19) and Argit in this show, the original actors of them are Tara Strong and Alexander Polinsky.

See also
List of Indian dubbing artists

References

External links

1979 births
Indian male voice actors
Living people